Brian Riley is an American ice hockey coach and the third consecutive member of his family to coach at Army.

Career
Brian Riley made his debut at the college ranks as a freshman for Brown in 1979. While the team didn't enjoy much success in his four years there, Riley was able to use the experience to begin a college coaching career a year after graduating in 1983 when he became an assistant at SUNY-Plattsburgh. After three seasons Riley jumped up to the Division I ranks with Lowell but remained at the job for only one season.

Riley returned to his hometown of West Point in 1989–90 as an assistant coach under his brother Rob, remaining there until 1996 when he left to take on his first head coaching job at Shattuck-Saint Mary's, a preeminent prep school. Riley coached the Sabres for two years before leaving to return to West Point, remaining as an assistant until his brother stepped down as head coach in 2004, making way for Brian to run the family business.

Since taking control of the team Riley has led the Black Knights through a relatively stable period in the program's history, having remained in the same conference for at least his first ten seasons and even producing a conference regular season title in 2007–08 (Army's first).

Head coaching record

References

External links

1959 births
Living people
American ice hockey coaches
Brown Bears men's ice hockey players
Army Black Knights men's ice hockey coaches
Ice hockey coaches from New York (state)
People from West Point, New York
American men's ice hockey forwards
Ice hockey players from New York (state)